Amazing Grace is a 1992 Israeli film directed by Amos Guttman.

It is one of the few Israeli films dealing with gay subjects and the only one so far which has dealt with AIDS. The film includes a biography details the life of Guttman and it was his last film before he died of AIDS.

Plot
The young Jonathan leaves his family's home in the Moshav, moves to "the big city" of Tel Aviv and finds an alienated and lonely world. He falls in love with Thomas (Sharon Alexander), an HIV patient, and a love story develops between the two.

Cast

Awards
The film won the Wolgin Award at the Jerusalem Film Festival and Best Film award at the Haifa International Film Festival.

References

1992 films
Israeli drama films
HIV/AIDS in film
Israeli LGBT-related films
Films shot in Israel
Films about LGBT and Judaism
Films directed by Amos Guttman
1992 LGBT-related films
1992 drama films
1990s Hebrew-language films